Karin Hendschke (married Raddatz) is a former East-German figure skater. She is the 1984 World Junior Champion. During her competitive career, she represented the club TSC Berlin. 

Karin Hendschke studied sport at the DHfK Leipzig. She works now as a coach at her home club TSC Berlin and is also an ISU technical specialist.

Results

References

Navigation

Living people
Year of birth missing (living people)
German female single skaters
International Skating Union technical specialists
World Junior Figure Skating Championships medalists